Tony Emanuel King (born May 6, 1947) is an American actor, political activist, and retired football player. A player for the Buffalo Bills for only one season in 1967, King subsequently became an actor and appeared in numerous exploitation and B movies, including several produced in Italy. In the 1980s, he became a member of the Nation of Islam, and changed his name to Malik Farrakhan. He currently serves as the head of security for the hip-hop group Public Enemy.

Filmography

References

External links 
 

1947 births
Living people
American male film actors
Members of the Nation of Islam